Shawn Occeus (born December 15, 1997) is an American professional basketball player for the Rio Grande Valley Vipers of the NBA G League. He played college basketball for the Northeastern Huskies.

Early life and high school career
Occeus was born on December 15, 1997 in Boca Raton, Florida.

Occeus went to high school at Park Vista Community High School for two years. He transferred to Grandview Preparatory High School in Boca Raton, Florida, where he played basketball between 2014–15 and 2015-16. During his junior year he averaged 13.5 points, 5.2 rebounds, 3.5 assists, and 1.5 steals per game. On February 23, 2016, Occeus was named PBgametime boys player of the week after averaging 24.5 points and 12.5 rebounds per game in two regional playoff wins. During his senior year he averaged 19.5 points, 9.4 rebounds, 4.5 assists and 1.2 steals per game. Occeus earned Florida Association of Basketball Coaches 2A Player of the Year honors as well as leading Grandview to the state championship.

College career
Occeus averaged 5.4 points and 1.9 rebounds during his freshman year, playing all 31 games and starting in 27 of them. On February 22, 2018, he scored a career-high 24 points and had four three-pointers in an 80-75 win against Towson. During his sophomore year Occeus was the Huskies second leading scorer, averaging 10.8 points, 2.5 rebounds and 1.8 assists per game. He was named CAA Defensive Player of the Year. Occeus struggles with injuries as a junior, missing every game until his season debut on December 8, 2018, and then from February 2, 2019 versus Hofstra until the conference tournament. In his final season at Northeastern, Occeus averaged 9.9 points, 2.7 rebounds and 1.9 assists per game. He led the Huskies into the NCAA tournament, where the were defeated by the Kansas Jayhawks. Following the season, Occeus initially announced that he was transferring before ultimately turning professional.

Professional career

Rio Grande Valley Vipers (2019–2021)
Occeus was selected by the Salt Lake City Stars with the seventh pick in the second round of the 2019 NBA G League draft. On November 6, 2019, his contract was put on waivers. On December 26, 2019, the Rio Grande Valley Vipers claimed him from the player pool, but on January 21, 2020 his contract was put back on waivers, only to be added to the Vipers roster 2 days later. Occeus averaged 2.5 points and 1.3 rebounds throughout the 2019-20 season. During the 2020-21 season, he averaged 6.4 points, 1.7 assists, and 1.1 steals per game.

Phoenix Hagen (2021–2022)
On June 18, 2021, Occeus signed with Phoenix Hagen of the German ProA.

On December 1, 2022, Occeus was acquired by the Cleveland Charge, but was waived six days later, before appearing in a game for them.

Return to Rio Grande Valley (2022–present)
On December 25, 2022, Occeus was reacquired by the Rio Grande Valley Vipers.

Career statistics

College

|-
| style="text-align:left;"|2016–17
| style="text-align:left;"|Northeastern
| 31 || 27 || 21.1 || .409 || .376 || .526 || 1.9 || .9 || .8 || .2 || 5.4
|-
| style="text-align:left;"|2017–18
| style="text-align:left;"|Northeastern
| 33 || 28 || 28.9 || .457 || .343 || .787 || 2.5 || 1.8 || 1.9 || .5 || 10.8
|-
| style="text-align:left;"|2018–19
| style="text-align:left;"|Northeastern
| 15 || 7 || 26.5 || .392 || .319 || .605 || 2.7 || 1.9 || 1.3 || .6 || 9.9
|-
|- class="sortbottom"
| style="text-align:center;" colspan="2"| Career
| 79 || 62 || 25.4 || .429 || .347 || .685 || 2.3 || 1.5 || 1.4 || .4 || 8.5

NBA G League

|-
| align=center | 2019–20
| align=left | Rio Grande
| 18 || 2 || 9.9 || .429 || .261 || .286 || 1.3 || .9 || .4 || .2 || 2.5 
|-
| align=center | 2020–21
| align=left | Rio Grande
| 15 || 14 || 25.7 || .351 || .283 || .636 || 3.5 || 1.7 || 1.1 || .3 || 6.4
|- class="sortbottom"
| style="text-align:center;" colspan="2"| Career
| 33 || 16 || 17.1 || .375 || .277 || .500 || 2.3 || 1.3 || .7 || .2 || 4.3

References

External links
Northeastern Huskies bio

1997 births
Living people
American men's basketball players
Basketball players from Florida
Northeastern Huskies men's basketball players
Phoenix Hagen players
Rio Grande Valley Vipers players
Shooting guards
Sportspeople from Boca Raton, Florida